Gold Coast Stadium may refer to:

 Carrara Stadium, an oval ground in the suburb of Carrara, Queensland
 Robina Stadium, a rectangular stadium in the suburb of Robina, Queensland